Ib Benoh (né Ibrahim Benoh) is an American multidisciplinary artist of Jordanian-Syrian-Libyan origin. Benoh's lifelong efforts to break the confines of geographical, cultural, and social boundaries as he lived across four continents, seeking personal freedom and redefining identity, gave way to a wide range of works. He has worked in painting, sculpture, drawing, two and three-dimensional construction, traditional and digital printmaking, new media, poetry, critical writing, and scholarly research. 

Benoh exhibited at various galleries and museums. He had solo and group shows in the Middle East, North Africa, Italy, and the United States, including New York where he was recognized by Betty Parsons in 1980. Though he left the art market in 1988, Benoh continued focusing on experimental work that led to his breakthrough approach to painting and new media.

Benoh's early exposure to infinity, the Sufi practice of oneness that transcends artificial divisions — along with reading extensively on the various philosophical thoughts of the ancient and contemporary scientific approach to understanding oneself and our world — fueled his work over the years. Ideas within the realm of infinity seeped into his work, such as interconnectedness, transformation, regeneration, continuity, variations, boundlessness, expansiveness, motion, timelessness, weightlessness, and nothingness. He creates harmony between the visual and the poetic as his artworks develop simultaneously with his poems.

Early life

Born to Jordanian parents of Libyan descent, Benoh lived in Amman for the first four years until his family moved to Damascus. His father served in the Arab Legion of the Royal Jordanian Army, under general Glubb Pasha. His mother was privately educated. Benoh only knew a little about his paternal grandparents. His paternal grandfather, head of a high school in Khoms, Libya, had died not long after fleeing his homeland to evade capture by Italian invaders for his role in funding the resistance.

Though his family lived in humble surroundings, Benoh had a culturally vibrant upbringing - filled with art, poetry, music, literature, and storytelling. His mother often played the oud and sang at family gatherings. One of Benoh's earliest memories is spending Thursday evenings watching and imitating the Sufis next door, chanting and spinning.

Growing up, Benoh exhibited a ferocious appetite for literature. He had access to books that had belonged to his late maternal grandfather, a judge, who had left behind a fascinating library, which included handwritten and hand-illustrated books. After school, Benoh educated himself by reading extensively on various subjects, including medicine, science, regional and international law, the three Abrahamic religions, Hinduism, Buddhism, poetry, and philosophy by Sufis and other intellectuals.

Besides reading, Benoh also devoted much of his time through his teen years to writing, drawing, and painting. He wrote short stories, plays, poetry, thoughts, and observations. Often Benoh painted with watercolors on paper outdoors using river water, developing a ritual of sending his finished watercolor paintings down one of the seven rivers flowing through Damascus and watching his work fade away.

Benoh grew up in a family of artists. His maternal grandmother created quilts. She involved him in gathering scrap fabrics from friends and family and had him select the cut pieces for her designs. Benoh’s maternal uncle Mahmoud Jalal was a respected artist in the region. Growing up, Benoh dreamt of traveling to Rome to study at the art academy just like his uncle and cousin Khaled Jalal had done before him.

As his appetite for learning new skills grew, Benoh actively sought instruction. Not finding a local source, he enrolled in a mail correspondence program with an art school in Paris. His first major purchase with his allowance was a book on Renaissance art, his prized possession, which he cherished and diligently studied. Adding to his daily independent activities, Benoh began dabbling with clay sculpting. His insatiable appetite for growing his artistic skills was finally satisfied when he enrolled at a newly established art center in downtown Damascus.

Early sculptures and exhibitions 

At thirteen, Benoh began his formal artistic training in sculpture and drawing at the Center of Fine Arts of Damascus. The art center became his home away from home for the next eight years. Inevitably, he made friends with the maintenance man who would unlock the doors for Benoh to work on his sculptures at odd hours. Seeing his dedication, the center eventually allocated one room for Benoh to work on large-scale sculptures independently. Benoh was introduced to Western classical music as he sculpted and drew from life at the center.

While maintaining his love for Arabic literature, Benoh also discovered works by international writers and read Leo Tolstoy, Victor Hugo, and Ernest Hemingway extensively, as well as existentialists like Jean-Paul Sartre and Simone de Beauvoir.

During the years of his academic training at the art center, Benoh participated in yearly group exhibitions held by the art centers of major cities in Syria, including a 1968 group show with one of his larger-than-life sculptures exhibited at the National Museum of Damascus. As a practicing artist, he gained membership at the Damascus Artists Association of Fine Arts in 1971.

In 1970 Benoh was offered a prestigious sculpture commission for Damascus. With the help of four assistants who were masonries by trade, Benoh constructed a 13-meter enlarged relief replica of Assyrian Lion Hunts.

In his early twenties, Benoh was on his way to become one of the leading sculptors in the region. However, soon after completing the commission, Benoh left Syria to pursue other dreams.

Along with his interests and activities, Benoh’s interactions with mystics, artists, poets, and intellectuals in a free and politically unrestricted environment during the 50s and 60s in Damascus, laid the ground for his mature work ahead.

Public commission for the city of Damascus

Early paintings and exhibitions 

In January 1972, Benoh left Syria with a one-way ticket and headed for North Africa. He traced his heritage in Khoms and Tripoli, Libya, and visited Tunisia for the first time. While residing in Libya, Benoh obtained a Libyan citizenship and became an active art community member, working at the Unity of Fine and Plastic Arts department in the Ministry of Culture in Tripoli. 

He sporadically published satirical cartoons and some of his written works. In his published contribution, "Truthfulness in Children's Art," written for the All Arts magazine, Benoh spoke of the overpowering directive methods in early art education having hindering effects on the natural creative act of a child.

Living in a new environment, filled with bright colors and North African light, Benoh fully engrossed himself in experimental painting in gouache and later acrylics. Fascinated with the openness of Tripoli to the Mediterranean Sea, he abstracted from life the ever-changing movement of the waves, capturing the energy of the natural elements through large brushstrokes. He participated in regional group exhibitions with his new paintings and represented Libya in significant art events outside the country. Years later, he would reflect that, at the time, he was unaware of Modern Art in America.

Selected works from 'The Sea' series: Tripoli

Living in Rome and first solo exhibition 

In 1973, Benoh finally fulfilled his lifelong dream of studying in Rome at the Academy of Fine Arts, where he studied under artist and professor Marcello Avenali.

While living in Rome for the next four years, Benoh produced paintings reminiscent of his joyful childhood, influenced by North African heritage and African light and colors. He exhibited these brightly contrasting works in his first solo show held in Rome.

During this prolific time, Benoh painted at his studio and frequented the local social hot spots to draw daily at the cafes and restaurants, sharing communal tables with other creatives, including painters, sculptors, filmmakers, and poets.

In his final year in Rome, Benoh published "L'Arte Infantile," his thesis, expanding on his affinity for the early stages of creative development from scribbling to the interruption of academic shaping.

Selected works from 'Dreaming of North Africa' series: Rome

Immigrating to the United States and US deput solo show 

The following year, he immigrated to the US. Upon settling in Connecticut, Benoh painted daily in preparation for an upcoming show. His acrylic paintings on canvas rapidly took on a new direction. Complex abstracted imagery resembled a colorful dream world. He began incorporating written rhythmic, poetic statements into his ink drawings on paper. This new body of work, consisting of poetry-infused ink drawings and paintings of whorls of colors, was presented at his US debut solo show at Carriage Barn Gallery, New Canaan, Connecticut.

Benoh's lifelong concern is harmony between people, species, and the environment. Some of his earlier drawings contain handwritten meditative prose, incorporated into the design, one of which with the motto, "Don't kill the whales' in several versions in the tail of a representation of the sea mammal." Another of Benoh's one-line ink drawings depicts a hunchback, along with several variations of a poem that ask not to blame the hunchback for being a hunchback. The artist's paintings, shown accompanied by the drawings in his 1978 exhibition, "are expressive of Benoh's philosophy of universal love."

Selected works from US debut one-man show: New Canaan

Moving to Rhode Island 

In 1978, Benoh moved to Rhode Island to attend Rhode Island School of Design graduate program.

During that time, Benoh further developed his artwork reflecting Eastern perspective influence. His ink drawings combined with meditative prose became more elaborate. Spontaneous freehand calligraphic marks dominated his numerous monoprint series. Overlapping abstract shapes intertwined with the 'infinite line' filled his acrylic-on-canvas paintings.

He participated in a group show at the RISD Museum. Immediately upon earning his MFA in Painting, he had a solo exhibition of his paintings and monoprints at the Woods-Gerry Gallery. For the next several years, his paintings gradually went through stages of simplification.

Benoh began teaching art in 1979 at RISD and later at various colleges and universities, concluding with George Washington University, Washington, DC in 2010.

Selected works from 1980: Providence

Joining the Betty Parsons Gallery 

Upon completing his graduate studies in 1980, Benoh returned to New Canaan, spending his days at his new studio. Shortly after, he received a call from Lee Hall, the then-president of Rhode Island School of Design, offering an opportunity to work at the Betty Parsons Gallery in New York.
Benoh accepted the position of Parsons’ assistant at her historic NY gallery without knowing anything about Parsons, a renowned gallerist and early promoter of abstract expressionism. Similarly, when Benoh began working at the gallery, Parsons wasn’t aware that Benoh was an artist. One morning, when Parsons was not at the gallery, Jack Tilton, the then gallery director, asked to see Benoh’s artwork that Benoh was taking to another gallery after work. Parsons walked in, saw the miniature paintings leaning against a desk, and exclaimed, “Marvelous, marvelous! Who is the artist?” Tilton pointed to Benoh with a smile. Parsons turned to Benoh in amazement and said, “And I thought you were a dancer!”  Parsons immediately asked Tilton to take Benoh’s work on consignment, spoke of giving Benoh a solo show in the future, and included him in the 1980 Christmas group show alongside works by such artists as Richard Tuttle, Saul Steinberg, Hedda Sterne, Toko Shinoda, Robert Yasuda, and Kenzo Okada.

Selected works from 'Betty's Ocean' series: New York 

Over time, Parsons and Benoh exchanged one another’s artworks. Parsons also acquired Benoh's miniature from a series of acrylic on cut-out paper, which Benoh named 'Betty's Ocean.'

For the first few months of working at Betty Parsons Gallery, Benoh utilized the daily train commute by producing various drawings. In his emotionally charged series, he reacted to an incident of a commuter suicide on the train tracks. Among his other series were his expressive mask-like drawings of boldly colored oil pastels on paper. Also, on the train, he completed several collections of broken and continuous lines on paper in ink and oil pastels.

Soon after taking up residency in New York City and only leaving the city during the summers to teach painting at Rhode Island School of Design, Benoh began experimenting with a minimalist use of space in his artwork. These experiments resulted in a series of hard-edge geometric compositions of oil and acrylic on partly peeled cardboard evocative of the city’s compacted, energetic urban life and architecture. Benoh presented his new work in a solo show at the William Francis Gallery in Providence, RI, which Kim Clark of The New Paper reviewed in 1981, stating that “Benoh, like the Cubists, is concerned with dimensionality - the timeless conundrum of  transforming three dimensions to a two-dimensional surface.” The artist “manipulates our perception of different colors so that what looks deep is sometimes shallow, and vice versa."

Selected works from the train collections: New York 

In 1982, Benoh left New York for five months to assist Faysal Al-Sudairy and Paul Borghi in establishing a new gallery, the Shada Gallery, in Riyadh, Saudi Arabia, and designing the interior of an office building space. Alongside his daily work-related activities, Benoh expressed his longing to return to New York in his drawing series “Flying Kites.” While away, Benoh kept in touch with Parsons and looked forward to establishing a new studio in New York upon his return. He planned to begin working on a new body of work and continue his discussions with Parsons regarding a solo show at her gallery. Before returning to the U.S., Benoh traveled to Rome, Paris, and Nancy by train. On his trip, he produced linear oil pastel drawings of the stretch of the French landscape. However, upon his return to New York, he was stunned to hear of Parsons’ passing. Soon after attending Parsons’ memorial, Benoh was included in a group show by Jack Tilton in his new gallery, which Tilton established in place of the Betty Parsons Gallery. Later, Benoh reflected on his experience with Betty Parsons as having a significant impact on him. In Benoh’s words, “Betty had a keen eye for art and a good heart for artists.” Parsons and Tilton were most supportive and encouraging of Benoh as an artist.

Selected works from Urban Dialog series: New York

Second gallery representation in New York City 

In 1982 Benoh joined the Tossan-Tossan Gallery in New York, where he went on to have numerous solo and group shows as a gallery artist for the next six years. For his first solo show at the new gallery, Benoh painted a series of diptychs on paper with bold acrylic brushstrokes, creating enclosed organic shapes suggestive of voluptuous figures. Reviewer Claude LeSuer of ArtSpeak noted the  three-dimensional effect in Benoh's two-dimensional work, "An almost sculptural quality is achieved by the way the pinned-down paper swells away from the wall, echoing the curve of painted forms."

Selected work: New York, 1983

Summers in Venice 
While living in Rome in the late seventies, and after moving to the US, Benoh frequently returned to Venice, where he rented a large apartment as his art studio for the duration of the summer. However, his last summer there, in 1986, did not go as expected. Benoh went through a trying time of self-evaluation, during which he faced artist’s block. One day he ran into his friend from his earlier time in Rome, whom he would later refer to as Sufi; Wahid Magharbe with wife came to stay with Benoh to care for him. Soon Benoh was able to express his state of mind in a series of collages and small mixed media works, which included a self-portrait of a photographic image of himself taken at a photo booth, juxtaposed with pictures of Venice. Eventually, he had a breakthrough and began painting again. His friend documented the first moments of Benoh applying large strokes of paint onto large paper. That year Benoh exhibited his mixed-media artworks in a group show. In the year prior he participated with his experimental paintings in a group show.

Selected work from self-portrait series: Venice

Doctor of Arts 
Benoh's relentless pursuit of reconciling objects within a flat picture plane persisted through the early 90s. He articulated this infinite continuum of shifting between dimensions in his published doctoral dissertation, An Examination Of The Process of Transforming Two Dimensional Constructions Into Three Dimensional Art Works, stating, “The six projects developed for this study explore spatial effects that take place in two and three-dimensional works in which constant shifting takes place between illusionistic and realistic space.” Benoh combined his martial arts practice with his interest in altering dimensionality in a series of visual experiments: transferring drawings on paper from life and constructions of photographic collages into four abstract serial rearrangeable sculptures of mat-board, wire, and plexiglass. Benoh earned his Doctor of Arts in Studio Art degree from New York University in 1993.

Selected works from D.A. visual projects: New York

Artwork based on his published doctoral dissertation 

In the months following his dissertation's publication, while he was a professor of art in Kuwait City, Benoh began developing parts of the preceding visual projects in his Dimensional Transformation project. This four-part body of work, consisting of artworks of various mediums, was completed a year later, in 1996, at his summer studio in New York City and exhibited in Kuwait that same year. In the process, he enlarged the previously constructed five small pencil drawings into large drawings of acrylic on paper, which evolved into colorful geometric paintings of acrylic on canvas and further developed into architectural arrangements of spacial sculptures of acrylic on foam, concluding his project with mixed media constructions of acrylic on foam and wire. After two years in Kuwait, Benoh taught art courses for another two years in UAE at United Arab Emirates University before returning to the States.

Selected works from 'Dimensional Transformations': Kuwait and New York

Moving to Upstate NY 

In the late 90s, Benoh moved to upstate NY, where he kept a studio and taught art and developed new art courses at a local college. For the next few years, he created small-scale paintings on paper that retained remnants of the preceding Dimensional Transformations project. Some aspects of the miniature works transcended into his large-scale acrylic on canvas painting, "Muse." The grand, mural-like work of lush, colorful strokes symbolic of excitement and optimism was exhibited in a group show and soon after in a solo installation at the Roberson Museum and Science Center.

Letting go of pure color 

Benoh maintained using pure color in his paintings until the catastrophic event of the twin towers. In the early 2000s, Benoh began expressing anti-war sentiment in several major artworks, working in subdued tones.  

In one of his most notable anti-war artworks, "End of a World" — acrylic on canvas of unsettling imagery of anguish, rendered in what the artist calls 'broken illusionism' — Benoh addressed the violence of war in the world, specifically the catastrophic attack on the twin towers and the inhumane destruction of Iraq that followed. In 2004, art historian Albert Boime wrote of Benoh's 'colossal panorama': "[Benoh's] post-Abstract Expressionist tendencies and Cubistic analysis here correspond to the negative impact of world events." The artist "insists on salvaging it by reclaiming it symbolically in a creative act." Benoh stated, "As an artist, I do not express my feelings to one part but all-disseminating a bit of this energy to everything I have come to know and beyond."

End of a World painting: Binghamton

Moving to Washington, DC 
While teaching at George Washington University, Benoh completed his Breaking Boundaries, an installation of twenty-one paintings exhibited in 2006 at Roberson Museum and Science Center, Binghamton, NY. Benoh depicted a struggle between animal and human forms, alerting us to the dehumanization that stems from artificial divisions. Benoh shared that this work "was conceived when reflecting on the human tragedies that have befallen the world of late" and the "man-made conflicts of humans with their natural environment, with animals, with other humans, and within individuals themselves." Director of exhibitions, Peter Klosky observed Benoh's silhouetted human-animal compositions imparting "a sense of witnessing hidden intimacies as in the shadows cast upon a drawn shade." In his published statement, Benoh emphasized the need for humankind to create harmony between animals and other living organisms, stating: "Though humans dominate the world in many respects, we are still at the mercy of the laws of nature."

Breaking Boundaries installation project: Washington, DC

Current work and regenerative dynamics 

In his current work, Benoh liberates canvases from the bounds of shapes and divisions within a painted space that dominated his paintings before this dramatic shift. Benoh facilitates the emergence of a space infinitely full of motion in his compacted and energetically-charged canvases. He creates harmony between the visual and the poetic as his large canvases develop simultaneously with his poems. The mutual energy of words and paint intertwine in a singular meditative process.

The seemingly serene painted variations of meditative qualities stem from his preceding emotionally charged painting series in response to ongoing wars and human conflict. In Benoh’s transformative paintings of today agony gave way to healing.

Benoh's poetic prose, "Vision of the Painter," accompanying his body of paintings by the same title, offers a glimpse into the artist's state of mind as he worked through uncertain yet exciting aspects of his newly developed regenerative painting process.

Digital artwork and new media 

Once his groundbreaking canvas series began to take shape, Benoh integrated the inner workings of regenerative dynamics in his digital work evocative of infinity.

In one of his series of digital prints and new media, "Weightless," Benoh blurs the line between art and physics. When pondering the interplay of light and dark in his work, he states: "Weightless light and shadow are dynamic when in constant dialogue with motion. The shadow is the truth that triggers the imagination about the many possibilities of a hidden reality."

References

External links 
 Ib Benoh's Website

Living people
Year of birth missing (living people)
20th-century American painters
American male painters
21st-century American painters
20th-century American sculptors
21st-century American sculptors
American male sculptors
Abstract painters
American abstract artists
American contemporary painters
Rhode Island School of Design alumni
New York University alumni
People from Damascus
20th-century American male artists
American people of Libyan descent